Acrobelione halimedae is an isopoda parasite present in the waters off Singapore. First described in 2017, by Boyko, Williams & Shields.

Description 
Acrobelione halimedae is isopoda ectoparasite that infects the branchial chamber of the mud shrimp Austinogebia spinfrons of the coast of Singapore. The females measure up to 8.0 mm long, with a maximal width of 6.4 mm, head width 1.9 mm, and head length 1.5 mm. Currently there is no description of the male of the species.

References 

 
Isopoda
Crustaceans described in 2004